The canton of Bonnières-sur-Seine is an administrative division of the Yvelines department, northern France. Its borders were modified at the French canton reorganisation which came into effect in March 2015. Its seat is in Bonnières-sur-Seine.

It consists of the following communes:
 
Adainville
Arnouville-lès-Mantes
Auffreville-Brasseuil
Bazainville
Bennecourt
Blaru
Boinville-en-Mantois
Boinvilliers
Boissets
Boissy-Mauvoisin
Bonnières-sur-Seine
Bourdonné
Breuil-Bois-Robert
Bréval
Chaufour-lès-Bonnières
Civry-la-Forêt
Condé-sur-Vesgre
Courgent
Cravent
Dammartin-en-Serve
Dannemarie
Favrieux
Flacourt
Flins-Neuve-Église
Fontenay-Mauvoisin
Freneuse
Gommecourt
Goussonville
Grandchamp
Gressey
Guerville
Hargeville
La Hauteville
Houdan
Jouy-Mauvoisin
Jumeauville
Limetz-Villez
Lommoye
Longnes
Maulette
Ménerville
Méricourt
Moisson
Mondreville
Montchauvet
Mousseaux-sur-Seine
Mulcent
Neauphlette
Notre-Dame-de-la-Mer
Orgerus
Orvilliers
Osmoy
Perdreauville
Prunay-le-Temple
Richebourg
Rolleboise
Rosay
Saint-Illiers-la-Ville
Saint-Illiers-le-Bois
Saint-Martin-des-Champs
Septeuil
Soindres
Tacoignières
Le Tartre-Gaudran
Le Tertre-Saint-Denis
Tilly
Vert
La Villeneuve-en-Chevrie
Villette

References

Cantons of Yvelines